Marcus Porcius M. f. M. n. Cato Salonianus (born c. 154 BC) was the younger son of Cato the Elder, and grandfather of Marcus Porcius Cato Uticensis, also known as "Cato the Younger".

Salonianus' father was Marcus Porcius Cato, consul in 195 BC, and censor in 184.  Celebrated for his courage, austerity, and strict moral code, the elder Cato, who already had a grown son by his first wife, Licinia, took a second wife at an advanced age, choosing the daughter of his client and scribe, Salonius.  He was eighty years old when his younger son was born, and since both sons bore the praenomen Marcus, they later came to be referred to as Cato Licinianus and Cato Salonianus, after their mothers.

Licinianus died soon after the birth of his younger brother, and Cato the Elder died in 149, when Salonianus was five years old.  The younger Cato lived to attain the praetorship, but died during his year of office, leaving two sons, Marcus and Lucius.  Both would pursue public careers, like their father and grandfather, and also like Saloninus and his brother, neither were long-lived.  Marcus was tribune of the plebs, and a candidate for the praetorship at the time of his death, some time before the outbreak of the Social War, in 91 BC, while Lucius would achieve the consulship in 89 BC, only to fall in the course of the war.

By his son Marcus, Salonianus was the grandfather of Cato the Younger, a notable adherent of Stoicism, whose lifestyle emulated that of Cato the Elder.  Famed for his conservative views, austerity, and stubbornness, the younger Cato served as praetor, and became a staunch supporter of Gnaeus Pompeius Magnus during the Civil War, choosing to take his own life rather than be captured by Caesar, even though he would almost certainly have been pardoned.

Family

See also
 Porcia gens

References

Bibliography
 Plutarchus, Lives of the Noble Greeks and Romans.
 Aulus Gellius, Noctes Atticae (Attic Nights).
 Dictionary of Greek and Roman Biography and Mythology, William Smith, ed., Little, Brown and Company, Boston (1849).

154 BC births
2nd-century BC Romans
Cato Salonianus, Marcus
Roman Republican praetors
Year of death missing